The Chak or Chaq dynasty (Kashmiri: ژَھک وَمش) was a Shia Muslim dynasty of Dardic origin that ruled over the Kashmir sultanate in medieval Kashmir after the Shah Mir dynasty. The dynasty rose to power in 1561 in Srinagar after the death of the Turco-Mongol military general, Mirza Haidar Dughlat when Ghazi Shah assumed the throne by dethroning Habib Shah, the last Shah Mir Sultan. The dynasty ended in 1589 when Yakub Shah surrendered to Akbar.

Origin 
Lankar Chak, a direct ancestor of the ruling Chaks, migrated from Gurez, Dardistan to Kashmir with his family during the reign of Suhadeva. The Chaks became highly influential after the invasion of the Mongol commander Zulchu as they started to gain the confidence of the nobles and councillors. They also served the first Sultan of Kashmir, Rinchan as members of his court. After Rinchan's death Udyanadeva was given authority but soon fled the country. Kota Rani assumed the throne and appointed Chaks in many important offices in her cabinet. Kota Rani was later challenged by Shah Mir, a close associate of Rinchan. The Chaks sided with Shah Mir and gave their all for Shah Mir's sake. Shah Mir later succeeded and appointed Lankar Chak as his Mīr Bakhshī (Commander-in-Chief), the most important post in the Kashmir army. The Chaks later declined and restricted much of their activities until the times of Zain-ul-Abidin when Pandu Chak, the leader of the Chaks started a rebelion against Zain.

Chaks were ferocious and formidable warriors who defeated armies much larger in number than them. They had special instinct in battle competence and excelled in battle strategies especially in guerilla tactics and Utara.

Architecture 

The Chak Sultans, particularly Husain Shah Chak patronized many construction projects but due to their political instability and constent threats from the Mughals, their architectural expertise was much restricted. Ghulam Hasan Khuyehami, a Kashmiri author, in his book Tareekh i Hasan, says: 

Some of the architectural projects commissioned by the Chak dynasty in Kashmir include:

List of rulers

Yakub Shah was dethroned on 14 October 1586 by the Mughals but continued to use the title of the Sultan of Kashmir till 1589.

Religion
The Chak dynasty was the first Shia dynasty to rule over any part of northern India. It is also considered to be one of the eight Shia dynasties of Medieval India. The other seven includes Adil Shahi dynasty of Bijapur Sultanate, Nizam Shahi dynasty of Ahmednagar Sultanate, Qutb Shahi dynasty of Golconda Sultanate, Malik dynasty of Makran Sultanate, Maqpon dynasty of Baltistan, Trakhan dynasty of Gilgit and Turi dynasty of Kurram Valley. The rulers of the dynasty played a significant role in spreading Shi'ism .

See also
 List of Monarchs of Kashmir

References

History of Kashmir